BC Bus North is a public intercity bus service created by the Province of British Columbia after Greyhound Canada cancelled all services in British Columbia, leaving the Highway 16 and Highway 97 corridors without passenger transportation options. In its first month of operation, June 2018, the service saw 300 riders, while its second month saw an increase to 450 riders. While BC Transit does not operate BC Bus North or share branding, BC Bus North is listed as a public transit system by BC Transit.

Routes

BC Bus North operates four routes. Not all stops are listed below.

 Route 100 (Prince George - Prince Rupert): Twice weekly service on highway 16 through Vanderhoof, Burns Lake, Smithers, Terrace, and Port Edward, and many other intermediate stops. This route parallels the route of Via Rail's Jasper-Prince Rupert train.
 Route 200 (Prince George - Valemount): Twice weekly service on highway 16 through McBride and Tête Jaune Cache. Service to Prince George begins in McBride, starting with and inbound journey to Valemount, and opposite service concludes with a return to McBride from Valemount. This route also parallels the route of the Jasper-Prince Rupert train.
 Route 300 (Prince George - Fort St. John): Twice weekly service on highway 97 through Mackenzie, Chetwynd, Dawson Creek, and six other intermediate stops.
 Route 400 (Dawson Creek - Fort Nelson): Once weekly service through Fort St. John and five other intermediate stops.

List of Stops Serviced

Azouzetta Lake
 Bear Lake
 Buckinghorse River Lodge
 Chetwynd
 Dawson Creek
 Fort Fraser
 Fort Nelson
 Fort St. John
 Fraser Lake
 Houston
 Gitsegukla
 Groundbirch
 Kitwanga Junction
 Mackenzie
 Mackenzie Junction
 McBride
 McLeod Lake
 Moricetown
 New Hazelton
 Pine Centre (Prince George)
 Pink Mountain
 Prince George, British Columbia
 Prince Rupert
 Prophet River
 Taylor
 Telkwa
 Topley
 Vanderhoof
 Westgate Mall (Prince George)
 Wonowon

References

Bus transport in British Columbia
Intercity bus companies of Canada